Practical Magic is a 1998 American fantasy romantic drama film based on the 1995 novel of the same name by Alice Hoffman. The film was directed by Griffin Dunne and stars Sandra Bullock, Nicole Kidman, Stockard Channing, Dianne Wiest, Aidan Quinn, and Goran Višnjić.

Bullock and Kidman play sisters Sally and Gillian Owens, descended from a long line of witches. Raised by their aunts after their parents' death from a family curse, the sisters were taught the uses of practical magic as they grew up. As adults, Sally and Gillian must use their magic to destroy an evil spirit before it kills them.

The film is considered a cult classic.

Plot

In a small Massachusetts town, the Owens family have been ostracized for over 300 years after their ancestor, Maria Owens, used witchcraft to survive an attempted execution. Heartbroken when the father of her unborn child never returned to her, Maria cast a spell to prevent herself from ever falling in love again. The spell developed into a curse upon Maria's descendants, bringing death to any man an Owens woman loves.

Young Gillian and Sally Owens are taken in by their aunts, Frances and Jet, after both their parents succumb to the Owens curse. The sisters endure harsh bullying by the local children. After witnessing their aunts cast a love spell for a woman infatuated with a married man, Sally casts a spell on herself to ensure she will only fall in love with a man who possesses certain impossible traits, with the goal that she will never fall in love. Meanwhile Gillian, witnessing the same incident, cannot wait to fall in love. When the girls are teens, Gillian elopes with her boyfriend and leaves for Los Angeles. Before Gillian departs, she and Sally make a blood spell to always be faithful to one another.

Gillian spends the next decade moving from relationship to relationship across the country, while back in Massachusetts, Sally meets and marries a man named Michael. They enjoy a normal life in town and have two young daughters, Kylie and Antonia. After Michael is fatally hit by a truck, Sally and her daughters go to live with the aunts. After the aunts reveal that they secretly cast a love spell on her so that she could marry and be happy, Sally forbids them from teaching her daughters magic.

Sally sinks into depression after Michael’s death. Sensing her pain, Gillian astrally projects to Sally from Arizona and they spend the night reconnecting. Gillian explains that she has become involved with an attractive yet intense man named Jimmy Angelov, whom she drugs with belladonna so she can sleep. Healed by Gillian’s visit, Sally finds strength to open the botanical shop she had planned with Michael. 

Gillian suddenly calls from New York asking for help and Sally immediately goes to pick her up. The aunts take Sally's daughters to a moon festival while she's gone. After Sally finds Gillian, Jimmy holds them both hostage in his car and commands Sally to drive at gunpoint. At Gillian’s insistence, Sally sneaks belladonna into Jimmy's tequila to sedate him, but the high dosage inadvertently kills him instead. Realizing that the belladonna in Jimmy’s blood would ruin a self-defence plea, the sisters take his body back to the aunts' house intending to resurrect him with a forbidden spell. He awakens and immediately chokes Gillian. Sally kills him again, and the sisters bury his body in their garden, agreeing not to tell the aunts. The following morning the aunts return with the girls and are overjoyed at Gillian’s homecoming, but their late night celebration is interrupted by a malevolent presence they can all sense. When Sally and Gillian deny it, the aunts leave them to clean up their own mess.

The next morning, state investigator Gary Hallett arrives from Tucson, Arizona in search of Jimmy, whom Gary reveals is wanted for first degree murder. After the sisters provide no clues, Gary interviews the locals for any details about the Owens family. Sally gets frustrated and agrees to invite him for breakfast to answer his questions. Upon finding Sally's diary, Kylie and Antonia surmise that Gary is the impossible man from the childhood love spell. Afterwards, Sally breaks down and confesses to Gary in his hotel room, taking full blame for Jimmy’s death. Unable to deny their attraction, they kiss but Sally flees when she realizes Gary is the man she conjured. 

Returning home, Sally discovers Jimmy's spirit has possessed Gillian's body. Gary follows her and arrives in time to see Jimmy's spirit emerge. Jimmy tries possessing Gary, but is turned aside by his silver badge. Sally tells Gary he is there because of her spell, the feelings they have for each other are not real, and the family curse will kill him if they pursue a relationship. Gary replies that curses only work if one believes in them, before returning to Tucson.

Jimmy possesses Gillian again and tries killing Sally before Frances and Jet return. Realizing she must embrace magic to save her sister, Sally asks the aid of the townswomen and they form a coven to exorcise Jimmy's spirit. Their first attempt hurts Gillian and Sally makes them stop. In a moment of inspiration, Sally re-enacts her blood pact with Gillian. Jimmy’s spirit is expelled from Gillian and the family curse is finally broken. Jimmy is sealed into the grave. 

In Tucson, Gary clears the sisters of any suspicion in Jimmy's death and returns to Massachusetts to be with Sally. By Halloween, the townsfolk have finally embraced the Owens family and gather to watch the witches float down from the highest roof of their house. The film ends with Sally and Gary sharing a kiss.

Cast
 Sandra Bullock as Sally Owens, a witch who becomes widowed after the Owens curse kills her husband. She abandons magic and doesn't allow her daughters to practice it.
 Camilla Belle as young Sally Owens
 Nicole Kidman as Gillian Owens, Sally's free-spirited sister who embraces her heritage, leaves their small town and becomes the victim of an abusive relationship.
 Lora Anne Criswell as young Gillian Owens
 Goran Visnjic as James "Jimmy" Angelov, Gillian's lover. Originally from Bulgaria, he's an abusive alcoholic with a cowboy style who kidnaps the sisters, and is killed by them in self-defense, twice.
 Stockard Channing as Frances Owens, aunt of Sally and Gillian, who tends to be frank and assertive.
 Dianne Wiest as Bridget 'Jet' Owens, aunt of Sally and Gillian, who is kind and gentle.
 Aidan Quinn as Investigator Gary Hallet, from Tucson, Arizona, who questions Sally and Gillian in the disappearance of Jimmy Angelov and falls in love with Sally.
 Caprice Benedetti as Maria Owens, the first witch in the Owens family and the one who casts the spell that curses all her descendants.
 Evan Rachel Wood as Kylie Owens, Sally's elder daughter, who lives with her mother and the aunts after the death of her father, Michael. She looks and acts like Gillian.
 Alexandra Artrip as Antonia Owens, Sally's younger daughter, who also lives with her mother and the aunts after the death of her father. She has dark hair and a spunky personality.
 Mark Feuerstein as Michael, Sally Owens' husband and the late father of Kylie and Antonia Owens. He is a victim of his wife's family curse, which results in his untimely death when their daughters are young.
 Peter Shaw as Jack, Sally and Gillian's father, who died from the Owens curse when they were children.
 Caralyn Kozlowski as Regina Owens, Sally and Gillian's mother, who committed suicide after losing her husband to the Owens curse.
 Chloe Webb as Carla, a good friend of Sally's, who works at her shop.
 Lucinda Jenney as Sara, one of the town women, who initially fears the Owens family but later responds to Sally's call for help.
 Margo Martindale as Linda Bennett, another friend of Sally's who also works at her shop.
 Martha Gehman as Patty, one of the town women who responds to Sally's call for help.

Production
Practical Magic was filmed in part on an artificial set in California. Because the film's producers decided the house was a big part of the depiction of the Owens culture, a house to accurately represent that vision was built on San Juan Island in the state of Washington. While much of the set from California was brought to that location and placed inside the house, it took nearly a year to perfect the image of the house and the interior. The house, actually only a shell with nothing inside, was built only for this filming and was torn down after filming was completed. The small town scenes were filmed in downtown Coupeville, Washington, a Victorian-era seaside port town located on the south side of Penn Cove on Whidbey Island.

According to Sandra Bullock in the DVD commentary, while filming the scene where the Owens women are drunk and slinging insults, the actresses actually got drunk on very bad tequila brought by Kidman. The cast further stated in the film's commentary that they felt supernatural elements of the house started to affect them. Both the cast and crew claimed they heard supernatural noises while filming the coven scene at the end of the film. For the final scene with all of the townspeople at the Owens home, the entire population of the town where filming took place was invited to show up in costume and appear as townsfolk.

Music

Composer Michael Nyman's score to the movie was abruptly replaced with music by Alan Silvestri for the theatrical release. This last-minute change resulted in the release of two soundtracks, although as primarily a compilation album only the two tracks of newly created material were changed. A 50-track demo (the last two tracks being "Convening the Coven" and "Maria Owens") of Nyman's score has been circulating among fans as a bootleg. The complete Nyman score runs 62:30 and contains music that would later appear, in altered form, in Ravenous and The Actors, as well as a bit of his stepwise chord progression theme from Out of the Ruins/String Quartet No. 3/Carrington/The End of the Affair/The Claim. "Convening the Coven", though not "Maria Owens," was subsequently reissued on The Very Best of Michael Nyman: Film Music 1980–2001, and music that uses material related to this piece has not been used elsewhere.  "Convening the Coven" became "City of Turin" on The Glare.

Singer Stevie Nicks headlined the soundtrack's published advertisements, promoting her song "If You Ever Did Believe" and a new recording of her song "Crystal," both featuring Sheryl Crow on back-up vocals.

 Track listing
 "If You Ever Did Believe" – Stevie Nicks
 "This Kiss" – Faith Hill
 "Got to Give It Up (Pt.1)" – Marvin Gaye
 "Is This Real?" – Lisa Hall
 "Black Eyed Dog" – Nick Drake
 "A Case of You" – Joni Mitchell
 "Nowhere and Everywhere" – Michelle Lewis
 "Always on My Mind" – Elvis Presley
 "Everywhere" – Bran Van 3000
 "Coconut" – Harry Nilsson
 "Crystal" – Stevie Nicks
 "Practical Magic" – Alan Silvestri / "Convening the Coven" – The Michael Nyman Orchestra
 "Amas Veritas" – Alan Silvestri / "Maria Owens" – The Michael Nyman Orchestra

Certifications

Reception

Box office
Practical Magic opened at #1 with $13.1 million in ticket sales. The film went on to gross $68.3 million worldwide, less than its $75 million production budget.

Critical reception
Practical Magic received poor reviews from film critics. Review aggregator Rotten Tomatoes gives the film a 23% approval rating based on 96 reviews, with an average rating of 4.60/10. The site's consensus states: "Practical Magics jarring tonal shifts sink what little potential its offbeat story may have -- though Nicole Kidman and Sandra Bullock's chemistry makes a strong argument for future collaborations." Another review aggregator, Metacritic, which assigns a weighted average score out of 100, gives a score of 46 based on reviews from 22 critics. Audiences polled by CinemaScore gave the film an average grade of "B-" on an A+ to F scale.

Owen Gleiberman of Entertainment Weekly gave Practical Magic a negative review, calling it "a witch comedy so slapdash, plodding, and muddled it seems to have had a hex put on it." Roger Ebert of the Chicago Sun-Times said that the film "doesn't seem sure what tone to adopt, veering uncertainly from horror to laughs to romance."

Accolades

In other media
In 2004, Warner Bros. and CBS produced Sudbury, a television pilot written by Becky Hartman Edwards and directed by Bryan Spicer starring Kim Delaney in the role played by Bullock in the film and Jeri Ryan in the role played by Kidman. The series, named for the Sudbury, Massachusetts location of the novel and film, was not picked up.

In 2010, Warner Bros. and ABC Family attempted to develop a prequel television series.

See also
 List of ghost films

References

External links

 
 
 
 

1998 films
1998 comedy-drama films
1998 fantasy films
1998 romantic comedy films
1998 romantic drama films
1990s English-language films
1990s fantasy comedy-drama films
1990s romantic comedy-drama films
1990s romantic fantasy films
American fantasy comedy-drama films
American romantic comedy-drama films
American romantic fantasy films
Films about curses
Films about sisters
Films about witchcraft
Films based on American novels
Films based on fantasy novels
Films based on romance novels
Films directed by Griffin Dunne
Films produced by Denise Di Novi
Films scored by Alan Silvestri
Films set in Massachusetts
Films shot in Washington (state)
Films with screenplays by Akiva Goldsman
Films with screenplays by Robin Swicord
Village Roadshow Pictures films
Warner Bros. films
1990s American films